Bertram Phillips was a British film director of the silent era.

In 1927–29, he directed several short films in the DeForest Phonofilm sound-on-film process, including Arthur Roberts Sings "Topsey-Turvey" (April 1927), The New Paris Lido Club Band (1928), Ag and Bert (1929) with Mabel Constanduros and Michael Hogan, and The Percival Mackey Trio (1929).

Selected filmography
 The White Star (1915)
 Won by Losing (1916)
 The Chance of a Lifetime (1916)
 A Man the Army Made (1917)
 Rock of Ages (1918)
 Faust (1923) comedy short film starring Jeff Barlow
 Tut-Tut and His Terrible Tomb (1923) comedy short film
 The School for Scandal (1923)
 The Alley of Golden Hearts (1924)
 Her Redemption (1924)

See also
Phonofilm

References

External links

British film directors
Year of birth unknown
Year of death unknown